The 2019 Estonian Athletics Championships was the 102nd edition of the national championship in outdoor track and field for athletes in Estonia. It was held between 17–18 August at the Kadriorg Stadium in Tallinn.

The 10,000 metres races were held separately on 25 July and combined events championship on 26–27 July in Rakvere. Estonian championships in marathon were held in Tallinn Marathon.

Results

Men

Women

References

Results
 Eesti meistrivõistlused. Estonian Athletics Federation. Retrieved 2022-06-30.

External links
Estonian Athletics Association website

Estonian Athletics Championships
2019 in athletics (track and field)
2019 in Estonian sport
2019 in sports
Sports competitions in Tallinn